Staraya Tolba is a rural locality (a village) in Yesiplevskoye Rural Settlement, Kolchuginsky District, Vladimir Oblast, Russia. The population was 8 as of 2010. There are 2 streets.

Geography 
Staraya Tolba is located 22 km east of Kolchugino (the district's administrative centre) by road. Novobusino is the nearest rural locality.

References 

Rural localities in Kolchuginsky District